Salpa fusiformis, sometimes known as the common salp, is the most widespread species of salp. They exhibit diel vertical migration, moving closer to the surface at night. They can occur in very dense swarms, as solitary zooids or as colonies. Solitary zooids usually measure  in length. They are barrel-shaped and elongated, with a rounded front and a flat rear. They are usually barrel or spindle-shaped.

References

Thaliacea
Animals described in 1804
Taxa named by Georges Cuvier
Cosmopolitan animals